The 1940 United States presidential election in Wyoming took place on November 5, 1940, as part of the 1940 United States presidential election. State voters chose three representatives, or electors, to the Electoral College, who voted for president and vice president.

Wyoming was won by incumbent Democratic President Franklin D. Roosevelt, running with the 11th Secretary of Agriculture, Henry A. Wallace, as his Vice President, with 52.82 percent of the popular vote, against the Republican candidate, American lawyer and corporate executive Wendell Willkie, running with Oregon senator Charles L. McNary, with 46.89 percent of the popular vote. Wilkie outperformed Alf Landon's 1936 result by 17 points, and flipped 9 counties that Landon lost: Big Horn, Campell, Converse, Fremont, Goshen, Niobrara, Sublette, Washakie, and Weston. 

Though originally against running for an unprecedented third term, Roosevelt was driven to do so after the outbreak of World War II in Europe when Germany invaded Poland in September of 1939. With the American public strongly against intervention is Europe, Roosevelt and Wilkie both promised not to get America involved in any foreign wars, however Wilkie accused Roosevelt of not doing enough to prepare for the possibility of war, which the incumbent rebutted when he built up America's military and transformed it into "The Arsenal of Democracy''. The Republicans then changed tactics and used this to accuse Roosevelt of secretly attempting to bring America into WW2, which Roosevelt had a more difficult time responding too and was more damaged by. Though the previous two elections had been largely contested over The Great Depression, by 1939 the United States had begun emerging from the Depression, however it would still be an important issue in the campaign as Roosevelt's "New Deal" programs were widely popular among voters and seen as ending the Depression, while Wilkie, a wealthy corporate executive, was damaged by his ties to Big Business, which working class voters still blamed for the Depression. Wilkie also warned about the dangers of breaking the two-term tradition, which was first begun by George Washington in 1789, and attacked Roosevelt for perceived incompetence and waste in his New Deal welfare programs. Despite his criticisms, Wilkie said that he would keep most of the New Deal programs, and would make them more efficient.

Because the country being locked in a deadheat with Nazi Germany, the United Kingdom actively interfered in the election, attempting to persuade Americans to abandon their isolationist positions and join the fight. The U.K. strongly backed Roosevelt however attempted to interfere in the Republican primaries to push a more hawkish candidate. America ultimately wouldn't enter the war against Germany until December 10th, 1941, a few days after the Japanese attack on Pearl Harbor.

With many voters weary of breaking the two-term tradition, Wilkie vastly outperformed Alf Landon's 1936 results not only in Wyoming, but the entire nation, winning 10 states compared to Landon's 2. However, Roosevelt's popularity would prove too difficult to overcome, and he would successfully win an unprecedented third term. This would be the last occasion Teton County would vote for a Democratic presidential candidate until Bill Clinton carried the county in 1992 – since then it has become a Democratic island in the nation's "reddest" state.

Results

Results by county

See also
 United States presidential elections in Wyoming

References

Wyoming
1940
1940 Wyoming elections